William J. Beckett (4 July 1915 – 5 April 1999) was an English footballer. He played for eight clubs in a circa fifteen-year career, six of which were during World War II.

He made five appearances in the Football League for Bradford City.

References

1915 births
English footballers
New Brighton Tower F.C. players
Tranmere Rovers F.C. players
South Liverpool F.C. players
Blackpool F.C. players
Bradford City A.F.C. players
Watford F.C. players
Northampton Town F.C. players
English Football League players
1998 deaths
Association football forwards